Renê Ferreira dos Santos (born 21 April 1992) is a Brazilian footballer who plays for Marítimo as a defender.

Born in Salvador da Bahia, he played with Grêmio Porto Alegre in Brazil. In 2012, he played on loan in Japan in the J1 League with Kawasaki Frontale.

In summer 2013 he joined Georgian side FC Zestafoni. In January 2015, Renê Santos signed for FC Dinamo Tbilisi.

On 10 January 2019, Renê Santos signed a contract with Marítimo.

Club statistics

References

External links

1992 births
Living people
Sportspeople from Salvador, Bahia
Brazilian footballers
Brazilian expatriate footballers
Association football defenders
Cruzeiro Esporte Clube players
Sport Club Corinthians Alagoano players
Esporte Clube Bahia players
Grêmio Foot-Ball Porto Alegrense players
Kawasaki Frontale players
FC Zestafoni players
FC Dinamo Tbilisi players
Erovnuli Liga players
C.S. Marítimo players
Paraná Clube players
Atlético Clube Goianiense players
Esporte Clube Vitória players
Al-Raed FC players
J1 League players
Primeira Liga players
Saudi Professional League players
Expatriate footballers in Japan
Expatriate footballers in Georgia (country)
Expatriate footballers in Portugal
Expatriate footballers in Saudi Arabia
Brazilian expatriate sportspeople in Japan
Brazilian expatriate sportspeople in Georgia (country)
Brazilian expatriate sportspeople in Portugal
Brazilian expatriate sportspeople in Saudi Arabia